The arroyos of Santa Fe, along with the Santa Fe River, make up the drainage network of the city and region of Santa Fe, New Mexico.  Besides drainage, the arroyos provide a network of pathways for recreation and exercise when they are dry.

Significant arroyos include Arroyo de los Chamisos, Arroyo Hondo, Arroyo de la Piedra, Arroyo de los Pinos, Canada Ancha, Arroyo Barranca, Arroyo Rosario, Arroyo Mascaras, Arroyo en Medio, Arroyo del Cerro, and Arroyo Saiz.

References

External links
 Santa Fe Watershed Association (SWFA) map of arroyos and projects

Rivers of New Mexico
Santa Fe County, New Mexico